You Lucky Dog is a 2010 American-Canadian made-for-TV film starring Natasha Henstridge, Harry Hamlin and Anthony Lemke.

Plot
After her mother's death, New York City fashion designer Lisa Rayborn (Natasha Henstridge) returns to her hometown and family farm. Due to a weak economy, her brother Jim (Harry Hamlin) has converted the family business from a cattle farm into a sheep farm, despite their father's (Lawrence Dane) objections. To help out, Lisa decides she will stay to help on the farm. She adopts a border collie from the local animal shelter and trains it as a sheepdog, naming the dog Lucky. Jim and Lisa decide to enter Lucky in a sheep herding contest, but when a severe windstorm sparks a forest fire, Lucky helps rescue a girl named Kristina (who is lost and almost died) and brings her to safety. While doing so, Lucky's leg is burned, and it looks as if she will not be able to compete.

Cast

 Natasha Henstridge as Lisa Rayborn
 Harry Hamlin as Jim Rayborn
 Lawrence Dane as Clay Rayborn
 Anthony Lemke as Don Lally
Alex Cardillo as Alex
 Geri Hall as Bonnie
Matthew Olver as Arena announcer
Erin Pitt as Erin
Janaya Stephens as Katie
Maya Lowe as Maya
Mason Posival as Mason
Erin Pitt as Erin
David Talbot as Mayor Schirmer
Bill Lake as Sheriff Hoskins
Derek McGrath as Bus Driver
Candy Larson as Laurie
Kristina Miller as Kristina
Murray McRae as Rich Preston
Keith Kemps as Minister
James Longworth as EMT #1
Kristine Klohk as Nancy
Scott Wickware as Neil Ingram
Bustin as Lucky

Kim Purich as sheep wrangler

Release
The film, which premiered on June 26, 2010 on cable network The Hallmark Channel, was primarily sponsored by Pedigree pet food company. The release of this movie coincides with The Pedigree Foundation's sixth annual Adoption Drive.

References

PR Newswire Pedigree Food for Dogs and Hallmark Channel Team Up to Help Raise Awareness for Homeless Pets
Variety Review June 24, 2010
You Lucky Dog IMDb entry

External links
You Lucky Dog official Hallmark Channel site

The Pedigree Foundation

2010 television films
2010 films
Canadian drama television films
English-language Canadian films
Films about dogs
Films shot in Ontario
Hallmark Channel original films
Films directed by John Bradshaw (director)
2010s English-language films
2010s Canadian films